The Åland Islands dispute was one of the first issues put up for arbitration by the League of Nations on its formation. Åland's population's demand for self-determination was not met and sovereignty over the islands was retained by Finland, but international guarantees were given to allow the population to pursue its own culture, relieving the threat of forced assimilation by Finnish culture as perceived by the islanders.

Background
Prior to 1809, Åland was located within the boundaries of the Swedish realm. However, in the Treaty of Fredrikshamn on September 17, 1809, Sweden had to give up control of the islands, along with Finland, to Imperial Russia. The Grand Duchy of Finland became an autonomous entity, including the Åland Islands, within the Russian Empire. After the Åland War, by the Treaty of Paris of April 18, 1856, which ended the Crimean War, Britain required Russia to withhold the construction of any new fortifications on the islands. This stipulation was obeyed, despite unsuccessful attempts to change the status of the demilitarised islands in 1908. However, in 1914, at the start of the First World War, the Russian government turned the islands into a submarine base for the use of British and Russian submarines during the war.

Military crisis

In December 1917, fearing the effects of the Russian October Revolution, the Finnish parliament proclaimed that Finland was now a sovereign state, calling on the principles of national self-determination. The very same autumn, Ålanders had organized for their own self-determination, fearing what they saw as excessive expressions of pro-Finnishness and anti-Swedishness in Finland. By this time, well above 90% of the islands' inhabitants considered themselves Swedish, stationed military personnel excluded, in contrast to Mainland Finland, where less than 15% were Swedish-speaking. Unlike in Åland, in the previous twenty years social tensions had also worsened considerably in Finland. The Ålanders' answer was a wish for secession from the Grand Duchy of Finland and the Russian Empire, to which they felt little affiliation, and a request for annexation by Sweden.

Sweden's power elite was, however, preoccupied with Sweden's democratization that was recently commenced by a conservative cabinet in order to quench the revolutionary currents among Swedish workers. To that effect, Sweden got a new liberal prime minister, and for the first time socialists in the cabinet. Although activist circles close to the royal court were enthusiastic towards the Ålanders' plea for Swedish support, the activists had lost their political influence in 1916, and ultimately also the ear of King Gustav V. Representatives for the Ålanders were fed sympathetic words and empty phrases.

The Finnish Civil War starting in January 1918, initially did not change this situation. Sweden's Social Democrats had the year before purged the revolutionaries from the party, and were sympathetic but unsupportive of the socialist republic in Finland. Their coalition partners in the cabinet, the Liberals, were rather inclined to sympathize with the White government in Finland, but they were traditionally neutralist and additionally rather suspicious of their Finnish counterparts.

Exaggerated reports of civilian apprehension concerning the approaching combatants of the civil war resulted, however, in the dispatch of a minor Swedish naval expedition, tasked with evacuating civilians who wished to leave. It turned out that no civilians wished evacuation, but the naval commander proudly brokered an end to hostilities and remained on the Main Island as a peace-keeping force. It is evident that the chain of command was considerably more inclined towards activism than the Socialist Minister of Defence, who in turn was persuaded to be considerably more supportive of intervention than his cabinet colleagues. It is less clear to what degree other cabinet members were briefed in between cabinet meetings, or even whether they had a say. Stockholm did not perceive anything of moment, and anything that happened was unintended by the government and well-intentioned by the naval officer in charge.

The White government in Vaasa saw it differently. They were well-informed about activist desires to re-acquire the Åland Islands, since many of the Swedish military officers who volunteered to come to White Finland's support were close to the leading activists. The White government was alarmed by the arrival of Swedish troops on Finnish soil, and suspicious of Sweden's Socialist Minister of Defence. A German naval force was urgently asked to remove the Swedish troops from Åland.

Political crisis
The leading Swedish Social Democrat, Hjalmar Branting, opted for dealing with the issue purely from the standpoint of international law. The cabinet of Finland viewed this position as a purely tactical one, and a dispute over whether the islands rightfully belonged to Sweden or Finland ensued. In 1921, again despite the fact that 90 percent of the islands' population was Swedish — and that they expressed an almost unanimous desire of being incorporated into Sweden — the League of Nations determined that the Åland Islands should remain under Finnish sovereignty, which is often attributed to the skill of its Minister to Paris, Carl Enckell, who also was envoy to the League of Nations as well as in charge of Finland's presentation of the Åland question. 

The additional, perhaps decisive, merit is attributed to Finland's Envoy to Japan, professor G.J. Ramstedt, who was an important foreign influencer in Japan, managed to point out to the Japanese delegation in the League of Nations that the Åland Islands are in fact a continuous archipelago that joins it with Finland, and furthermore, that deep sea waters separate them from Sweden. Japan's own interests in controlling Pacific islands would be aided by such a precedent, and it consequently gave important support to Finland. Also, one of the important proponents of a diplomatic solution to the case was Nitobe Inazō, who was one of the Under-Secretaries General of the League and the director of the International Bureaux Section, in charge of the International Committee on Intellectual Cooperation.

Aftermath
The interrelated difficulties in the relations between Sweden and Finland were resolved by the mid-1930s, when the weakened authority of the League of Nations signalled a much harsher international mood. The fear of the Åland Islands' falling under the control of Nazi Germany or the Soviet Union was very real, and that is why Sweden's Foreign Minister Sandler proposed retaining the status of the islands despite Sweden's longstanding policy of neutrality. Detailed defensive plans were made; however, in the end, Sweden opted not to participate in the defence of the islands.

Autonomy of Åland Islands
In 1920, Finland granted wide-reaching cultural and political autonomy to the Åland Islands. The League of Nations considered these measures as satisfying demands to protect the Swedish language and culture there.

During the course of the 20th century, Finnish sovereignty had been perceived as benevolent, and even beneficial, by increasing numbers of the islanders. Together with disappointment over insufficient support from Sweden in the League of Nations, Swedish disrespect for Åland's demilitarized status in the 1930s, and to some degree a feeling of shared destiny with Finland during and after World War II, this has resulted in a changed perception of Åland's relation to Finland: from "a Swedish province in Finnish possession" to "an autonomous part of Finland".

See also

 Åland's Autonomy Day
 Finland–Sweden relations
 International crisis
 Swedish neutrality

References

Further reading
 Walters, F. P. A History of the League of Nations (Oxford University Press, 1952). online

External links
 Decision of the Council of The League of Nations

Dispute
1921 in Sweden
1921 in Finland
League of Nations
1920 in international relations
1921 in international relations
Diplomatic incidents
Finland–Sweden relations